Héctor Miguel Zelada Bertoqui (born 30 April 1957) is a former Argentine football goalkeeper. He started his career at Rosario Central but he played mostly in Mexico, for Club América. He was the third-choice goalkeeper for the Argentina side that won the 1986 FIFA World Cup but didn't play a minute; in fact, he never played a game for the national team.

Career
Héctor Miguel Zelada began his career with Rosario Central in 1976, making 92 appearances. In 1978, 20-year-old Zelada made a move to Mexico City club América. He would make his debut in a league match against Guadalajara on 4 March 1979. The match ended in a 0–0 draw. He won his first league title with América during the 1983–84 season, having a standout performance against Guadalajara in the second-leg of the final, with the score 2–2 after the first-leg. In the second-leg, game was tied 0-0 when Zelada committed a foul in the penalty area. He subsequently saved Eduardo Cisneros' penalty kick. América would go on to win the final 3–1.

Zelada would go on to win the 1984–85 and the Prode-85 championships with América and play in over 250 matches for the club. His final match was a 1–1 draw against León in 1990. He would move to Atlante F.C. that same year, playing in 58 matches before officially retiring in 1992.

Honours

Club
América
Mexican Primera División: 1983–84, 1984–85, Prode-85
Campeón de Campeones: 1988, 1989
CONCACAF Champions' Cup: 1987

International
Argentina
FIFA World Cup: 1986

Individual
Mexican Primera División Golden Ball: 1983–84

References

External links
Realidad Americanista article

1957 births
Living people
People from San Jerónimo Department
Argentine people of Basque descent
Argentine people of Spanish descent
Argentine footballers
Rosario Central footballers
Association football goalkeepers
1986 FIFA World Cup players
FIFA World Cup-winning players
Club América footballers
Atlante F.C. footballers
Argentina international footballers
Argentine expatriate footballers
Argentine Primera División players
Liga MX players
Expatriate footballers in Mexico
Argentine expatriate sportspeople in Mexico
Sportspeople from Santa Fe Province